Khak Beh Tiyeh (also Romanized as Khāk Beh Tīyeh, Khākbetīyeh, Khāk Betyeh, and Khāk Petyeh) is a village in Pishkuh-e Zalaqi Rural District, Besharat District, Aligudarz County, Lorestan Province, Iran. At the 2006 census, its population was 512, in 86 families, making it the most populous village in the rural district.

References 

Towns and villages in Aligudarz County